The Hayfield Branch was a  single-track branch line that ran along the Sett Valley from the Hope Valley Line near  to , via one intermediate stop, . It passed under the town of New Mills through the  rock-cut Hayfield tunnel.

History

Opening

The branch opened, in 1868, to serve the villages along the valley of the River Sett and the local mills. It became the joint property of the  Manchester, Sheffield & Lincolnshire Railway (later Great Central) and the Midland Railway. It remained a joint line, latterly owned by the London and North Eastern Railway and the London Midland Scottish Railway, until nationalisation of the railways in 1948.  Passenger numbers were high especially in the summer months, as the line provided easy access to the countryside. 

The branch was subsequently assigned to the London Midland Region of British Railways. Introduction of diesel multiple unit (DMU) trains led to an improvement in passenger services and, by the 1960s, there was an hourly frequency to and from Manchester Piccadilly, with some additional trains at peak times. Unlike some neighbouring lines, the station also enjoyed an hourly Sunday service which was popular with walkers.

Kinder Reservoir
A short-lived continuation of the line was built in the early 20th century to convey materials and workmen during the construction of Kinder Reservoir.

Closure
After World War II, passenger traffic on the line reduced. The whole Manchester Piccadilly-Romiley-Hayfield line had been included in the 1963 Beeching cuts proposals; however, the government chose instead to retain the Hope Valley line in favour of closing the Woodhead line to passenger services. The Hayfield line was closed in January 1970.

The site today
The line was purchased from British Rail by Derbyshire County Council in 1973 and now forms the Sett Valley Trail.

References

External links

 1947 timetable
 Line on a 1948 OS Map
 

Closed railway lines in the East Midlands
Rail transport in Derbyshire
Railway lines opened in 1868